Great Canal Journeys is a British television series in which a pair of presenters take canal barge and narrowboat trips in the United Kingdom, Europe, India and Egypt. The series was originally aired on More4 before transferring to Channel 4 with Series 2.

The original presenters were husband and wife Timothy West and Prunella Scales. Both are keen narrowboaters and were involved in campaigning to revive the Kennet & Avon Canal. West and Scales both talk frankly about Scales' dementia during the series, which was praised by Alzheimer’s Research UK.

In 2020, West and Scales were replaced by TV personality Gyles Brandreth and actor Sheila Hancock for series 11. In the first episode Timothy West gave the two novice canal boaters a crash course in barging.

Episodes

Series 1

 No Viewing Figure means not within BARB Top 30.

Series 2

Series 3

Series 4

Series 5

Series 6

Series 7

Series 8

Series 9 

 If viewing figure is blank then the programme was not in the weekly top 10 on BARB.

Series 10 
The series has been subtitled Asian Odyssey and is billed as Prunella Scales and Timothy West's last canal journey.

Series 11

Series 12

Special

DVDs

With the exception of the London Ring episode in series 2, all of first eight series have been issued on DVD; the series numbering, however, is different.

 Series 3 and 4 are combined and called series 3
 Series 5 and 6 are combined and called series 4
 Series 7 and 8 are combined and called series 5

References

External links

2014 British television series debuts
2021 British television series endings
2010s British documentary television series
2010s British travel television series
2020s British documentary television series
2020s British travel television series
Channel 4 documentary series
English-language television shows